Lemyra melli is a moth of the family Erebidae. It was described by Franz Daniel in 1943. It is found in China (Yunnan, Shaanxi, Zhejiang, Tibet, Shanxi, Gansu, Sichuan, Heilongjiang, Jilin, Liaonin, Hebei).

Subspecies
Lemyra melli melli (China: Sichuan, Yunnan, Jiangxi, Hubei, Hunan, Guangxi, Sichuan, Yunnan, Tibet)
Lemyra melli shensii (Daniel, 1943) (China: Shaanxi, Heilongjiang, Jilin, Liaonin, Shanxi, Hebei, Gansu)

References

 

melli
Moths described in 1943